"Niggas in Paris" (edited for radio as "In Paris" or simply "Paris"; censored on the album as "Ni**as in Paris") is a song by American rappers Jay-Z and Kanye West from their collaborative album Watch the Throne (2011). The song is built around a synth bell loop from the Dirty South Bangaz music library and also contains vocal samples from "Baptizing Scene" by Reverend W.A. Donaldson, an interpolation of "Victory" by Puff Daddy featuring The Notorious B.I.G. and Busta Rhymes, and dialogue excerpts from the 2007 film Blades of Glory. On the week of the album's release, "Niggas in Paris" debuted at number 75 on the Billboard Hot 100 eventually peaking at number five. Outside of the United States, "Niggas in Paris" peaked within the top ten of the charts in the United Kingdom. As of 2018, it has sold 6.7 million archetype digital units in the United States. The song won Best Rap Performance and Best Rap Song at the 55th Annual Grammy Awards.

Background

In an interview, Kanye West revealed that the song was inspired by his travels in Paris:

Artwork
The artwork for "Niggas in Paris" features the flag of France with a black third substituted for the blue one and is exactly the same cover used for Kanye West and Jay-Z's song "Why I Love You" which was released to radios simultaneously with "Niggas in Paris" on September 13, 2011. Alternative artwork, similar to the album cover, was used on Pandora.

Covers, remixes and freestyles
The official remix features rapper T.I. Remixes or freestyles on the production created by other artists include a remix by Chris Brown and T-Pain, a freestyle by Game titled "Niggas in Compton", a freestyle by Meek Mill which appeared on his mixtape Dreamchasers, a remix by Busta Rhymes, a remix by Chevy Woods titled "Taylors in Paris", a freestyle by Trey Songz which appeared on his mixtape #LemmeHolDatBeat2 titled "Trigga In Africa", a remix by E.S.G. titled "Niggas in Houston", and a remix by Felony titled "Niggas in Harris. Mos Def made a freestyle to the song called "Niggas in Poorest". Other rappers that did freestyles include Young Jeezy, Lil Wayne, Freddie Gibbs, Emilio Rojas, Traphik, and Romeo Miller.  Casper has at times performed a German version of the track at concerts.

In March 2012, Katy Perry performed a clean version cover of the track as part of a Live Lounge special for Fearne Cotton's show on BBC Radio 1.

American alternative metal band Faith No More covered the song live in 2012. The British rap metal/progressive metal/djent band Hacktivist released a cover of the song with an accompanying video in August 2013. Watsky released a freestyle of the song called "Ninjas in Paris".

The song was used in a promo for the 2012 NBA All-Star Game.

Music video
On December 13, 2011, after their last Los Angeles stop at Staples Center on their Watch the Throne Tour, Jay-Z announced that the live performance would be used for the song's music video. The video, which was produced by Good Company, was released on February 9, 2012, through VEVO and was directed by West himself. The video features the live concert footage treated with strobe effects, kaleidoscopic mirrored images, inserts of jungle cats, and imagery of Paris landmarks (prominently Notre Dame de Paris). As with the track itself, the video also features a brief snippet of footage from Blades of Glory. Kid Cudi, Hit-Boy, and King Chip make brief appearances in the video.
The video also contains a warning message to viewers on the flash photography in the video.

The video received a nomination for Video of the Year at the 2012 BET Awards, losing to the duo's other song Otis "Niggas in Paris" received two nominations at the 2012 MTV Video Music Awards for Best Editing and Best Hip-Hop Video. The song was also nominated for Best International Urban Video at the 2012 UK Music Video Awards.

Critical reception

The song received universal acclaim from critics. Rolling Stone commented on the song by saying "Jay and Ye come in hard over a slow, menacing beat and icy synthesizer notes, but regardless, this cut is mostly memorable for including an unexpected sample of dialogue from the Will Ferrell/Jon Heder ice-skating comedy Blades of Glory. 'No one knows what it means, but it's provocative,' says Ferrell with deep conviction, essentially summing up the art of hip-hop lyrics." Erika Ramirez of Billboard commented on the song by saying, "Kanye steals the show on the Hit-Boy produced club anthem. A sampling of dialogue from the 2007 film Blades of Glory is tucked in between." The Guardian called the song a standout track on the album and also commented by saying "This percolating track could have been produced by Wiley, with sick sub-bass and a snare that sounds like static. Both rappers are in excellent form, with West repeating 'That shit cray'. Kanye begins in half-time and speeds up. Among the lines that jump out: "I'm suffering from realness" and 'Don't let me get in my zone.' A standout track." Pitchfork complimented that the song possessed great moments by Kanye West and said the following: "It also features this great Kanye moment, 'Doctors say I'm the illest because I'm suffering from realness/Got my niggas in Paris, and they going gorillas.'"

Pitchfork named "Niggas In Paris" the 12th best track of 2011 and Rolling Stone named it the second best of the year. XXL named "Niggas In Paris" the best song of 2011 as well as the "hottest beat" of 2011. Digital Spy placed this song on their 24th spot of the best songs of 2011. It was voted number 98 in Australia's annual Triple J Hottest 100, 2011. XXL named it one of the top five hip hop songs of 2011. The Village Voices Pazz & Jop annual critics' poll ranked "Niggas in Paris" at number five to find the best music of 2011. Amazon named it the eighth best song of 2011. Consequence of Sound placed it 13th on its list of the top 50 songs of 2011.

NME named "Niggas in Paris" the eighty-first best song of all time in 2014 and then later in the year, the best track of the decade thus far. In 2014, Fact ranked it 64th on their list of the 100 best songs of the decade. In 2015, Billboard listed it as the fifth best song of the 2010s. The song was chosen for the year 2011 in The Rap Year Book, which deconstructed the most important rap song from every year since 1979. The song was nominated for Anthem of the Summer at the 2013 UK Festival Awards In 2018, Rolling Stone named "Niggas in Paris" the 58th best song of the 21st century.

Live performances
The song has been performed on the Watch the Throne Tour. MTV News said with "the track's Will Ferrell intro ("We're gonna skate to one song and one song only") brought on the moment that everyone was waiting for." USA Today commented "at one point, as Jay-Z and West performed Niggas in Paris from their new hit CD, Watch the Throne, West exhorted the audience to "Bounce! Bounce!" The resulting stomping had Philips Arena rocking and shaking in a way that it hasn't for the Hawks in a long time."

In early stops, the song was performed three times. Kanye West and Jay-Z began performing the song more than thrice at the Miami show at American Airlines Arena by performing the song five times. The song was played six times at the TD Garden in Boston on November 21, 2011 setting a record for the tour at the time. It was then  broken when it was performed seven times at The Palace of Auburn Hills. It was again broken on December 1, 2011 at the United Center in Chicago, Illinois when the duo performed the song 8 times.

On December 12, 2011 at the Staples Center in Los Angeles, California, the song was played a total of 9 times, a record which would stand until the next night, when the duo performed the song 10 times. The crowd was also told that cameras had been brought to the concert for the record breaking December 13th performance to film the music video for the song. The song was also performed live as part of the 2011 Victoria's Secret Fashion Show. During the Final Tour Stop in Vancouver the aforementioned record was met again with the duo performing the song ten times on the final night, December 18 at Rogers Arena, despite several newspaper articles claiming that it was performed a total of eleven times.

On June 1, 2012 during their first date in Paris, at the Palais Omnisports de Paris-Bercy, they actually broke the record, performing the song 11 times. They claimed themselves that the record was held by Los Angeles, when Jay-Z said: "The record is held by L.A. with ten times. [..] But this song isn't called "Niggas in Los Angeles". [...] We gotta break that record and bring it to 11", thus ending the rumors concerning the record being broken in Vancouver. The last record (established in Paris as well) has been broke again on June 18, 2012, performed 12 times in Paris at Palais Omnisports de Paris-Bercy. The song was performed live at BBC Radio 1's Hackney Weekend on 23 June 2012 as part of the London 2012 Festival.

"Niggas in Paris" was also performed in Kanye's Israel concert at Ramat Gan Stadium on 30 September 2015.

Chart performance 
On August 27, 2011, "Niggas in Paris" made its debut on the US Billboard Hot 100 at number 75, making it the second highest debut for any non-single on the album behind only "Who Gon Stop Me". On the US Billboard Hot Digital Songs the song debuted at number 58 even before it was released as a single from the album. It eventually peaked at number five on the Billboard Hot 100, becoming the 11th top five hit for Jay-Z, and 10th for West. It was the third song on which they've teamed to make the top five, following "Swagga Like Us" and "Run This Town". The song had sold two million copies by February 2012, and reached three million in sales in the United States by December 2012. The song had the second most Rhythmic, and sixth most Mainstream R&B/Hip-Hop radio songs spins in the 2010s decade.

In the United Kingdom, the song peaked at number ten on the UK Singles Chart on March 18, 2012 ― for the week ending date March 24, 2012 ― spending ten weeks in the top 40 of the chart, selling 200,000 copies. According to the Official Charts Company, the song sold 432,000 copies in the United Kingdom in 2012. The song was the 17th most streamed song of 2012 in the UK. As of October 24, 2019, "Niggas in Paris" has sold 1.45 million chart sales in the UK and is ranked as West's fifth most successful track of all time on the UK Singles Chart.
In April 2017, Official Charts Company revealed "Niggas in Paris" was the 18th highest-selling hip-hop song of all time in the United Kingdom.

Credits and personnel 
The credits for "Niggas in Paris" are adapted from the liner notes of Watch the Throne.

Recording
 Recorded at Hôtel Meurice, Paris.

Personnel
 Kanye West – songwriting, vocals, production
 Jay-Z – songwriting, vocals
 Hit-Boy – songwriting, production
 Mike Dean – mastering, songwriting, production
 Anthony Kilhoffer – audio mixing, additional production
 Noah Goldstein – recording

Sample credits
 Contains samples from the 2007 motion picture Blades of Glory, used courtesy of Paramount Pictures, and contains elements of "Baptizing Scene", performed and written by Reverend W.A. Donaldson (from Alan Lomax's 1960 compilation Sounds of the South).

Charts

Weekly charts

Year-end charts

Decade-end charts

Certifications

Release history

References

External links
 

2011 singles
African-American diaspora in Paris
Roc Nation singles
Jay-Z songs
Kanye West songs
Grammy Award for Best Rap Performance
Song recordings produced by Kanye West
Songs written by Jay-Z
Songs written by Kanye West
Song recordings produced by Hit-Boy
Music videos directed by Kanye West
Roc-A-Fella Records singles
2011 songs
Songs about Paris
Def Jam Recordings singles